Baselining is a method for analyzing computer network performance. The method is marked by comparing current performance to a "baseline" derived from past performance. If the performance of a network switch or other network components is measured over a period of time, that performance figure can be used as a comparative baseline for configuration changes.

Uses
Baselining is useful for many performance management tasks, including:
 Monitoring daily network performance
 Measuring trends in network performance
 Assessing whether network performance is meeting requirements laid out in a service agreement

References

Network management